Jennifer Johnson may refer to:

Jennifer Johnson (criminal), convicted of perjury for lies she told in the trial of Russell Bishop (Babes in the Wood murders)
Jennifer Johnson (golfer) (born 1991), American golfer
Jennifer Johnson (table tennis) (born 1948), wheelchair basketball player and para table tennis player
Jennifer A. Johnson, professor of sociology
Jennifer J. Johnson, American legal scholar and academic administrator
Jennifer L. Johnson, American diplomat and U.S. State Department official
Jennifer M. Johnson, American television producer and writer
Jennifer Johnson Cano, American opera singer, previously known as Jennifer Johnson
Jennifer Carroll (born 1959), American writer, née Johnson

See also
Jennifer Johnston (disambiguation)
Jenny Johnson (disambiguation)